Hyperolius langi is a species of frog in the family Hyperoliidae.
It is found in Democratic Republic of the Congo, possibly Rwanda, and possibly Uganda.
Its natural habitats are subtropical or tropical moist lowland forests, subtropical or tropical moist montane forests, rivers, freshwater marshes, and intermittent freshwater marshes.
It is threatened by habitat loss.

References

langi
Taxa named by Gladwyn Kingsley Noble
Amphibians described in 1924
Taxonomy articles created by Polbot